Love... Is Like Dying is the sixth album by the American deathrock band, Theatre of Ice and their first for Orphanage Records.

Orphanage Records, an American label with a solid reputation in the Gothic rock and Deathrock music scenes, offered to re-release The Resurrection; but were unable to obtain any of the masters, except for the two live recordings, from Demented Mind Mill Records.  So Orphanage Records asked the band to re-record 7 of the songs from the album, one from The Haunting, two from Beyond the Graves of Passion, 5 new originals, and reuse the two live recordings. These 17 "new" songs were released in 1986 as Love... Is Like Dying. Even though John Johnson is credited as playing on the album, he had previously left the group and only appears on the two live recordings.

Love... Is Like Dying was an immediate success for both the band and for their new label. With Songs as diverse as Dreams of Fire and In The Attic, the album greatly increased their fan base and for the first time put them on the radar of college radio stations across the country.  This opened the door for the band to tour parts of the country it had never played live to, it was just up to their label to assure them that "nothing bad would happen" if they were to go on an extended tour.

Musicians 

Brent Johnson - Vocals, Guitars, Effects, Drums
John Johnson - Guitar, Synthesizer, Keyboards, Percussion
Dale Garrard - Guitars, Vocals, Ice

Track listing
Gone With The Worms
She Sleeps
In The Attic
Dark Haired Lady
Somewhere Anywhere
You Don't Know What You're Doin
Funeral Games (live)
Under a Cold Blue Moon
Livin in Fiction
Dark Horizons
Dreams of Fire
Crawl
Golden Girl
Hungry For Ruin
Creature
Santa Claws (live)

Reviews

OPtion Magazine - The title says it all—gloomy, overdone Halloween music.  Moanings through delays, delayed guitars, morbid lyrics, spooky synthesizer, and drum machine.  I think it's great, in the same kind of way as a Herschell Gordon Lewis film.  I'm not sure how much of the cheesiness is tongue-in-cheek, although I suspect quite a bit of it is, but either way there are some great sounds here, and it's thoroughly enjoyable to listen to.  Come Halloween I'm gonna play this out my window, watch the little kids run, and save myself some money on candy. -- Scott Lewis.

Notes 

1986 albums
Theatre of Ice albums